Robert Preston (1895 – May 1945) was a Scottish professional footballer who played in the Scottish League for Heart of Midlothian and in the Football League for Plymouth Argyle and Torquay United. He played as a wing half or centre half.

Career
Preston signed for Heart of Midlothian from Bathgate F.C. shortly before the outbreak of the First World War. In November 1914 he was among the Hearts players who volunteered to join Sir George McCrae's new battalion of the Royal Scots. Military service took him away from Edinburgh for five years, so it was 1919 before he made his debut for Hearts in the Scottish League First Division. He remained with the club until the 1922–23 season.

Preston then came to England to play for Torquay United, then a Southern League club, and moved on to Third Division South club Plymouth Argyle in 1923. He made 147 appearances for the club in all competitions. His last game for Argyle came at the end of the 1927–28 season, and he returned to Torquay United, by then a Football League team, for the following season.

Personal life
After retiring from playing, Preston moved to Ireland and became a publican. He died in 1945.

His elder brother Thomas was also a footballer who played for Airdrieonians and was selected for the Scottish League XI.

References

1895 births
1945 deaths
Date of death missing
Footballers from Edinburgh
People from Loanhead
Sportspeople from Midlothian
Scottish footballers
Association football defenders
Heart of Midlothian F.C. players
Torquay United F.C. players
Plymouth Argyle F.C. players
Scottish Football League players
Royal Scots soldiers
Southern Football League players
English Football League players
Bathgate F.C. players
Sligo Rovers F.C. managers
League of Ireland managers
Scottish football managers
British Army personnel of World War I
McCrae's Battalion